CNK may refer to:
Blosser Municipal Airports IATA airport code
Cinemark Theatress NYSE stock symbol
Compute Node Kernel, an operating system
Crash Nitro Kart, a 2003 video game